Lemlei Ngaleima or Ngareima is the goddess and the divine female personification of the fishes and the aquatic life in Meitei mythology and religion (Sanamahism) of Ancient Manipur (Antique Kangleipak). She is a sister (or friend) of the goddesses, Phouoibi, Thumleima and Ereima (Ireima).

Myths 
Menstrual blood, charoo (hay, dried paddy stalks), hentak (edible fish paste), sumjit (broom) are considered unholy to Goddess Ngaleima. So, if there is an adverse entry of fish into the fishing nets, the presence of menstruating woman is highly suspected at the spot, especially on the floating dam. Other suspicious reasons are the dropping down of the charoo (hay, dried paddy stalks) or hentak (edible fish paste) or sumjit (broom) by people out of jealousy into the place.

Association with other goddesses 
Goddess Ngaleima (Ngareima) is considered to be one of the divine manifestations of Leimarel (Leimalel), the supreme mother earth goddess. It is said that Leimalel becomes Ngaleima when she is in the fish yard.

In popular culture 
 Phou-oibi, the rice goddess is a 2009 ballad opera performed by the Laihui Ensemble. It is based on the story of the goddess and her sister Phouoibi.
 Phouoibi Shayon is a 2017 Manipuri mythology movie based on the story of the goddess and her sister Phouoibi.

See also 
 Imoinu (Emoinu) - Meitei goddess of wealth
 Ireima (Ereima) - Meitei goddess of water 
 Leimarel (Leimalel) - Meitei goddess of earth
 Panthoibi - Meitei goddess of civilization, love and warfare
 Phouoibi (Phouleima) - Meitei goddess of agricultural crops
 Thumleima - Meitei goddess of salt

References

External links 

 Ngaleima_archive.org

Abundance goddesses
Animal goddesses
Arts goddesses
Beauty goddesses
Fertility goddesses
Fortune goddesses
Leima
Magic goddesses
Maintenance goddesses
Meitei deities
Names of God in Sanamahism
Nature goddesses
Pastoral goddesses
Peace goddesses
Savior goddesses
Time and fate goddesses
Virgin goddesses